Belmar is an unincorporated community and census-designated place in Keith County, Nebraska, United States. As of the 2010 census it had a population of 216.

History
Belmar got its start following construction of the Union Pacific Railroad through the territory. It was likely named for a railroad official.

A post office was established at Belmar in 1910, and remained in operation until it was discontinued in 1941.

Geography
Belmar is in northwestern Keith County, on the north side of Lake McConaughy, a reservoir on the North Platte River. Nebraska Highway 92 runs through the community, leading west  to Lewellen and east  to Lemoyne.

Demographics

References

Census-designated places in Keith County, Nebraska
Census-designated places in Nebraska